Apam Napat is a deity in the Indo-Iranian pantheon associated with water. His names in the Vedas, Apām Napāt, and in Zoroastrianism, Apąm Napāt, mean "child of the waters" in Sanskrit and Avestan respectively. Napāt ("grandson", "progeny") is cognate with Latin nepos and English nephew. In the Rig Veda, he is described as the creator of all things.

In the Vedas it is often apparent that Apām Napāt is being used as a title, not a proper name. This is most commonly applied to Agni, god of fire, and occasionally to Savitr, god of the sun. A correspondence has also been posited by Boyce between both the Vedic and Avestic traditions of Apam Napat, and Varuna, who is also addressed as "Child of the Waters", and is considered a god of the sea. In the Iranian tradition, he is also called Burz ("high one," ) and is a yazad.

Role
In Yasht 19 of the Zoroastrian Avesta Apąm Napāt appears as the creator of mankind. However, since in Zoroastrianism Ahura Mazdā is venerated as supreme creator, this function of Apąm Napāt has become reduced. This is one reason Apąm Napāt is no longer widely worshipped, though he is still honoured daily through the Zoroastrian liturgies. The creator-god status is also seen in a hymn in honour of the Vedic Apām Napāt.

Alongside Mithra, Apąm Napāt maintains order in society, as well as Khvarenah, by which legitimate rule is maintained among the Iranian peoples. It is his duty to distribute water from the sea to all regions.

Fire and water
In one Vedic hymn Apām Napāt is described as emerging from the water, golden, and "clothed in lightning", which has been conjectured to be a reference to fire. His regular identification with Agni, who is described  a number of times as hiding or residing in water, and comparison with other Indo-European texts, has led some to speculate about the existence of a Proto-Indo-European myth featuring a fire deity born from water.

Other such mentions include the ninth-century Skaldic poem Ynglingatal, which uses the kenning sævar niðr 'kinsman of the sea' to refer to fire, and an old Armenian poem in which a reed in the middle of the sea spontaneously catches fire, from which springs the hero Vahagn, with fiery hair and eyes that blaze like sun.

Conjectured original fireless myth
Whether fire was an original part of Apam Napat's nature remains a matter of debate, especially since this connection is absent from the Iranian version. Hermann Oldenberg believed Apam Napat was originally an independent water deity who later came to be associated with Agni, in part because of an ancient Indian belief that water contained fire within itself, fire appearing to "enter into" water when quenched by it.

Associations with Savitr could be understood as similarly deriving from an image of the setting sun sinking into the ocean. Another theory explains the connection between fire and water through lightning, "the flash of fire born from the rainbearing clouds".

'Swamp gas' conjecture
Based on the idea that this fire-from-water image was inspired by flaming seepage natural gas, attempts have been made to connect the name "Apam Napat" to the word "naphtha", which passed into Greek – and thence English – from an Iranian language.

However, there is only a modest amount of evidence for a link between the sacred fires of Iranian religion and petroleum or natural gas – although the account of the blowing of the 3 sacred fires out to sea from the back of the ox Srishok where, unquenched, they continue to burn on the water is suggestive – particularly in relation to hydrocarbon deposits in the Southwestern part of the Caspian Sea, exploited currently by the Absheron gas field near Baku in Azerbaijan.

The etymology of the word "naphtha" has been claimed likely to relate to the Akkadian napṭu, "petroleum".

See also
 Ateshgah of Baku
 Atropatene
 Baba Gurgur
 Eternal flame
 Neptune
 The Land of Fire
 Yanar Dag

Notes

References

Further reading

External links
 
 

Hindu gods
Rigvedic deities
Sea and river gods
Neptune (mythology)
Persian mythology
Yazatas